Frank Opperman may refer to:

 Frank Opperman (South African actor) (born 1960), South African actor and musician
 Frank Opperman (American actor) (1861–1922), actor in American silent films